San Antonio is a small town in La Paz Municipality in the Mexican state of Baja California Sur, located near El Triunfo on Federal Highway 1. It had a population of 463 inhabitants in the 2010 census, and is situated 400 meters (1,312 ft.) above sea level.

History
With ships "St. Lazarus," "Santa Agueda" and "St. Thomas" above, in 1535, the existing port of La Paz, the conqueror Hernán Cortés and gives the name of Bay St. Croix. Years later Admiral Sebastian Vizcaino in Baptizes, 1596, as La Paz to the city is now the capital of the state of Baja California Sur. In 1616 the Dutch pirates, nicknamed "Pichilingues" anchor their boats, "Great Sun", and "Full Moon" in a bay near La Paz that carries his name now.

Isidro de Atondo and Antillon took possession in 1683, the port, and on behalf of Charles, 11 Spain, designated as the Port of Our Lady of La Paz. In 1720 was founded Mission La Paz by the Jesuit Fathers of Juan Ugarte and Jaime Bravo. The capital of the Californias is transferred to La Paz in 1830, with his political boss Colonel Manuel Victorio.

The comodoros Stockton, Shubreick and Jhones attack, in 1847, the port of La Paz, without encountering resistance. The political head, Francisco Palacios Miranda is submitted by the American army in the same year. In 1853, the filibuster Wílliam Walker, in his boat "Carolina," surprised the garrison paceña, with the chief political prisoner and taking possession of government offices, establishing what he called Republic of the two stars.

Faced with the threat of troops todosanteñas of Lieutenant Colonel Manuel Marquez de Leon, in 1853, the invader Walker leaves La Paz. In the year 1912 the Vice President Pino Suarez visited La Paz and there was received with sympathy.

Modern
With the relocation of the Free Municipality in 1972, in the area of the city of La Paz, is installed the first municipal council.

In 1975 approving the conversion of the then state Territory of Baja California Sur, leaving the city of La Paz as the municipality and at the same time as the state capital.

Since the arrival of the Spaniards to the area currently occupied by the municipality of La Paz, its inhabitants were subjected to a radical change, both in his life política-económica, and in the social, being the need to tackle first the conquerors, and then to pirate Americans and French. They have struggled against their fellow countrymen during the meetings of civil wars, military and so on. However, the municipality has managed to overcome these situations, becoming now the main point of Baja California Sur, as it is the headquarters of the Executive, Legislative and Judicial Branches, which lie in the city of La Paz, state capital.

The development of productive activities in the city of La Paz reflects significantly, the terms of the economic dynamics of the area, due to the economic influence of this capital city, in which the activities occupy a prominent place as a factor of paramount importance in the economic progress of the town in particular and the state in general, as well as being the gateway to the ancient ruins of guaycuras.

Shield
The stylized eagle represents the motherland shows that the Mexican nation and the world, history and the economic potential of the municipality of La Paz. The sword and the cross motivate knowledge of the Conquest and the evangelization of the region. The framework that oppresses the golden eagle's claws and silver inner frame symbolize wealth from the mines of this municipality, where reserves are held by the state in terms of the future of Mexico. The blue stripe on the side with fish symbolize the vast coastal area of the municipality with an abundance of the most diverse species of fish, crustaceans, mollusks and other shellfish.

In half the domestically are two rectangles; On the left, by the year 1535, the date of discovery of the territory in the city of La Paz, and on the right, the year of 1697, in which launched evangelism California. The skull of the conquest was lost over time. In the center, uniting these dates, is a sun off that symbolizes the historical past. In the bottom half of this eloquently expressed, which in 1972 marks the new era city.

The cog. The sun symbolizes the progress that illuminates with its rays in the municipality of La Paz. Expresses its motto: "Peace and Progress", showing their light beams in the Latin words "Coellum, Aqua et Tellusque Valde Bona," thereby expressing the full potential of the municipality. With its sky, water and good land and lavish. Finally, the most powerful rays illuminate the east of four valuable pearls symbolize the cities: La Paz, San Antonio, San Jose and All Saints!

Sources

External links
Site of San Antonio, Baja California Sur

Populated places in Baja California Sur